Sty and similar can mean:
Sty, an enclosure for raising livestock pigs
STY, an alternate socket name for GNU Screen
STY is the station code for Stratford-upon-Avon Parkway railway station
Siberian Tatar language, based on its ISO language code sty.

See also
Stye, an eyelid infection